Chalcosyrphus parvus  is a species of syrphid fly in the family Syrphidae.

Distribution
Canada, United States.

References

Eristalinae
Diptera of North America
Hoverflies of North America
Insects described in 1887
Taxa named by Samuel Wendell Williston